Chlorogloeopsis is a genus of cyanobacteria, and is the only genus in the family Chlorogloeopsidaceae.

References

Cyanobacteria genera
Nostocales